The following tables compare general and technical information for a number of notable webmail providers who offer a web interface in English.

The list does not include web hosting providers who may offer email services as a part of hosting package.

General

General information on webmail providers and products

Digital rights

Verification
How much information information users must provide to verify and complete the registration when opening an account (green means less personal information requested):

Secure delivery
Features to reduce the risk of third-party tracking and interception of the email content; measures to increase the deliverability of correct outbound messages.

Other

Unique features

Features

See also

 Comparison of web search engines - often merged with webmail by companies that host both services

References

Webmail Providers
Network software comparisons